Cho Hyun is a football player from South Korea.

He was a member of the South Korea U-20 team in early 1990s and went on to play as a professional in the K-League.

Club career statistics

External links
 
 

1974 births
Living people
Association football midfielders
South Korean footballers
Suwon Samsung Bluewings players
Ulsan Hyundai FC players
K League 1 players
Dongguk University alumni